Alpine skiing at the 2022 Winter Olympics was held at the Yanqing National Alpine Ski Centre in Yanqing District, China. The competitions took place from 6 to 20 February 2022.

Speed events were held on "Rock" course and technical events on "Ice River" course, for both men and women. Team event was held on "Rainbow."

A total of 306 quota spots (153 per gender) were distributed to the alpine skiing, a reduction of 14 from 2018. Eleven events were contested: five for men, five for women, and one mixed (team).

Qualification

A maximum of 306 quota spots were available to athletes to compete at the games. A maximum of twenty-two athletes could be entered by a National Olympic Committee, with a maximum of eleven men or eleven women.

On January 24, 2022, the IOC granted four extra male quotas while the FIS began investigating the legitimacy of some low level qualifying events.

Competition schedule
The competition schedule was altered from the original schedule due to weather conditions in Yanqing. All times were local (UTC+8).

Notes
 Men's downhill was postponed (high winds) from 6 to 7 February.
 Team event was postponed (strong winds) from 19 to 20 February.

Course information

Medal summary
Switzerland led all nations in the medal standings with five gold and nine medals overall.

Medal table

Medalists

Men's events

Women's events

Mixed

Participating nations
79 nations sent alpine skiiers to compete in the events.

References

External links
Official Results Book – Alpine Skiing

 
2022 Winter Olympics
Winter Olympics
Alpine skiing competitions in China
2022 Winter Olympics events